Chris Katjiukua (born 25 October 1986) is a Namibian professional footballer who played as a defender for several South African clubs and the Namibia national football team. He has played for Eleven Arrows and African Stars in Namibia, and Lamontville Golden Arrows, Highlands Park and Black Leopards in South Africa—before finishing with a gameless stint at Cape Town Spurs.

Club career

Early career
Born in Okakarara, Katjiukua started his career with Eleven Arrows where he won the Namibia FA Cup in 2011, before joining African Stars in 2011. He won the Namibia FA Cup again in 2013 with African Stars.

Lamontville Golden Arrows
Katjiakua joined Lamontville Golden Arrows in January 2014, and made his debut for the club on 8 February 2014, starting in a 3–2 win at home to Polokwane City. He made 2 further South African Premier Division appearances in the 2014–15 season as Golden Arrows were relegated to the National First Division.

He scored his first goal for Golden Arrows on 23 August 2014 in a 1–0 win over Black Leopards, their first game of the season. Over the course of the 2014–15 season, Katjiukua made 26 appearances, scoring twice, as Golden Arrows were promoted back to the South African Premier Division.

He made 16 appearances during the 2015–16 season and one during the 2016–17 season, though did not score during either season. In January 2017, he was released by Lamontville Golden Arrows following three years at the club.

Highlands Park
Following his release by Golden Arrows, he joined Premier Division club Highlands Park in February 2017, signing a two-and-a-half year contract with the club. He made his debut for the club on 7 February 2017, before going on to make 10 further appearances as Highlands Park during the 2016–17 season as they were relegated to the National First Division.

He scored his first goal for Highlands Park on 7 January 2018 in a 3–0 win away at Super Eagles, and would go on to make 17 appearances, scoring 3, in a season where they would be promoted back to the Premier Division.

Black Leopards
Despite having a year remaining on his contract at Highlands Park, he joined Black Leopards in October 2018, with him having not made a Premier Division appearance at Highlands Park following their promotion. He made 12 appearances without scoring for Black Leopards during the 2018–19 season, and 15 league appearances, scoring twice, during the 2019–20 season.

International career
In 2007, Katjiukua was called up to the Namibia national football team for the first time ahead of an international friendly against Malawi. He made his debut for Namibia in that match on 6 July 2007 as they defeated Malawi 2–1. He would go on to make two further appearances for Namibia in 2007 against Botswana and Lesotho, both in the 2007 COSAFA Cup as Namibia were knocked out in the group stage. His next appearance for Namibia on 26 March 2008, again against Malawi in a friendly, but did not appear for the national team again until 2011, when he played in a 1–1 draw against Botswana.

Katjiukua was part of the Namibia squad during the 2014 FIFA World Cup qualification and appeared in a 1–1 draw against Nigeria on 12 June 2013, where Namibia were praised for their performance despite conceding a late equaliser. He was also part of the Namibia teams for the 2013 COSAFA Cup, where they were knocked out in the quarter-finals, before being knocked out of the plate competition (a tournament for the teams knocked out in the quarter-finals) by Mozambique, a match in which he appeared. and also in the 2014 African Nations Championship qualification, where they were again knocked out by Mozambique, this time on penalties, with Katjiukua having missed his penalty during the shoot-out.

Katjiukua was part of Namibia's 2015 COSAFA Cup winning squad, and featured in every game of what is Namibia's first and only international tournament victory to date. On 21 May 2015, he scored his first goal for Namibia in a 4–1 win over Zimbabwe. The final saw Namibia beat Mozambique 2–0 with Katjiukua being praised for his defensive performances across the entire tournament. Following Namibia's success at the COSAFA Cup, Katjiukua remained a regular player for the Namibia, and appeared in every match of their 2017 Africa Cup of Nations and 2018 FIFA World Cup qualification campaigns.

As part of Namibia's successful 2019 Africa Cup of Nations qualification campaign, Katjiukua appeared in a 1–0 defeat away to Guinea-Bissau on 10 June 2017 and later a 0–0 draw at home to Guinea-Bissau. He was part of Namibia's provisional 28 man squad for the 2019 Africa Cup of Nations, but was not part of their final squad for the tournament.

On 15 November 2019, he scored his second goal for Namibia; a 76th minute headed winner in a 2–1 home victory over Chad.

Career statistics

International

International goals
As of 6 June 2020. Namibia score listed first, score column indicates score after each Katjiukua goal.

Honours
Eleven Arrows
 Namibia FA Cup: 2011
African Stars
 Namibia FA Cup: 2013
Lamontville Golden Arrows
 National First Division: 2014–15
Highlands Park
 National First Division: 2017–18
Namibia
 COSAFA Cup: 2015

References

External links
 
 
 

1986 births
Living people
Namibian men's footballers
People from Otjozondjupa Region
Association football defenders
Eleven Arrows F.C. players
African Stars F.C. players
Lamontville Golden Arrows F.C. players
Highlands Park F.C. players
Black Leopards F.C. players
Namibia Premier League players
South African Premier Division players
National First Division players
Namibia international footballers
Namibian expatriate footballers
Expatriate soccer players in South Africa
Namibian expatriate sportspeople in South Africa